Graeme Higginson (born 14 December 1954) is a New Zealand former rugby union player. A lock, Higginson represented Canterbury and Hawke's Bay at a provincial level, and was a member of the New Zealand national side, the All Blacks, from 1980 to 1983. He played 20 matches for the All Blacks including six internationals. He captained the All Blacks in one match, against Australian Universities in 1980.

References

1954 births
Living people
Canterbury rugby union players
Dalzell-Whitelock family
Hawke's Bay rugby union players
New Zealand international rugby union players
New Zealand rugby union players
People educated at Rangiora High School
Rugby union locks
Rugby union players from Rangiora